Half a Sinner may refer to:

Half a Sinner (1934 film), an American film directed by Kurt Neumann
Half a Sinner (1940 film), an American film directed by Al Christie